is a public holiday in Japan that usually occurs on September 22 or 23, the date of Southward equinox in Japan Standard Time (autumnal equinox can occur on different dates for different time zones). Due to the necessity of recent astronomical measurements, the date of the holiday is not officially declared until February of the previous year. Autumnal Equinox Day became a public holiday in 1948. Like other holidays, this holiday was repackaged as a non-religious holiday for the sake of separation of religion and state in Japan's postwar constitution.

Recent Japanese equinoxes

Celebration 
On this day, people will reconnect with their families by tending to the graves of ancestors, and visiting shrines and temples. People also celebrate the good weather and autumn harvest by enjoying outdoor activities and eating Shūbun no Hi snacks such as botamochi– a ball of sweet rice in azuki paste.

See also
 Japanese calendar
 Vernal Equinox Day
 Southward equinox

External links 

 Autumnal Equinox Day Celebration

References

Public holidays in Japan
September observances